Cerapachys doryloides is a species of ant in the genus Cerapachys. It was discovered and described by Borowiec, M. L. in 2009.

References

Dorylinae
Insects described in 2009